Cynddelw Brydydd Mawr ("Cynddelw the Great Poet";  or ;   1155–1200), was the court poet of Madog ap Maredudd, Owain Gwynedd (Owen the Great), and Dafydd ab Owain Gwynedd, and one of the most prominent Welsh poets of the 12th century.

Cynddelw began his career as court poet to Madog ap Maredudd, Prince of Powys. At Madog's death in 1160, Cynddelw wrote the following elegy: 

While Madog lived there was no man
Dared ravage his fair borders
Yet nought of all he held
Esteemed he his save by God's might…
If my noble lord were alive
Gwynedd would not now be encamped in the heart of Edeyrnion.

Cynddelw composed poems for a number of the later rulers of Powys, now divided into two parts, such as Owain Cyfeiliog and Gwenwynwyn. He also composed poems addressed to the rulers of Gwynedd and Deheubarth, and notably poems addressed to Owain Gwynedd and to his son Hywel ab Owain Gwynedd and later to Rhys ap Gruffudd of Deheubarth and to the young Llywelyn the Great. Poems and elegy to Lord Rhirid Flaidd of Penllyn. There is also a eulogy for Cynddelw's own son, Dygynnelw, who was killed in battle. He gives a vivid picture of the aftermath of a battle in one of his poems:

I saw after battle intestines on the thorns
Left for the wolves to bury.

Cynddelw was known in his time for opposing superstition, and the monks of Strata Marcella in Powys sent "a deputation to him with a requisition that he should renounce his errors, and make satisfaction to the Church, threatening, in case of non-compliance, that he should be excommunicated and deprived of Christian burial." His answer was the following:

Cen ni bai ammod dyfod—i'm herbyn
A Duw gwyn yn gwybod
Oedd iawnach i fynach fod
Im gwrthefyn nag im gwrthod.

Which, translated, reads, "Since no covenant would be produced against me, which the God of purity knows, it would have been more just of the monks to receive than to reject me."

Works
The traditional English names are not always direct translations of the Middle Welsh names.

"The First Panegyric on Owain Gwynedd"
"The Second Panegyric on Owain Gwynedd"
"The Third Panegyric on Owain Gwynedd"
"Elegy on Owain Gwynedd"
"A Contention with Seisyll for the Chair of Madog"
"To Madog Prince of Powys"
"The First Verses to Madog Prince of Powys"
"The Second Verses to Madog Prince of Powys"
"Elegy on Madog Prince of Powys"
"An Address to Madog's Family on His Death"
"Verses to Owain Son of Madog"
"A Verse to Owain Son of Madog"
"A Panegyric on Owain Son of Madog"
"Elegy on Owain Son of Madog"
"A Virgin Eulogy to Efa Daughter of Madog"
"To Llywelyn Son of Madog"
"Elegy on Cadwallon Son of Madog"
"An Ode to Owain Cyfeiliog"
"Elegy on the Family of Owain Gwynedd"
"The Reconciliation of the Lord Rhys"
"A Panegyric on the Lord Rhys"
"Elegiac Verses on Rhiryd"
"Verses on Rhiryd"
"Elegy on Rhiryd"
"Elegy on Einion ab Madog ab Iddon"
"Verses to Owain Cyfeiliog"
"The Reconciliation of Rhys Son of Gruffydd"
"Elegy on Ithel Son of Cadifor the Gwyddelian"
"Elegy on Iorwerth Son of Maredudd"
"The Circuit; or, Battles of Llywelyn"
"To Gwenwynwyn"
"Verses of Praise to Gwenwynwyn"
"Verses to Gwenwynwyn"
"An Ode to Tysilio"
"To God"
"A Sonnet to a Damsel"
"Verses to Ednyfed"
"Elegy on the Sons of Dwywg"
"Verses to an Alien of Llansadwrn"
"A Verse"
"Verses to Hywel Son of Ieuaf"
"Elegy on Bleddyn the Bard"
"Verses to Dygynnelw Son of Cynddelw"
"The Tribes of Powys"
"The Privileges of the Men of Powys"
"An Ode to Hywel Son of Owain"
"To Llywelyn"
"To the Monks of Strata Who Refused Cynddelw Burial"
"The Death-bed of Cynddelw"

See also

Cynddelw at Wikisource
Meic Stephens (ed). A Companion to Welsh Literature.

References

12th-century deaths
12th-century Welsh poets
13th-century deaths
Welsh male poets
Year of birth unknown
Year of death unknown